The Robert M. Carrier House, also known as the Matthews House, is a historic house in Memphis, Tennessee, U.S.. It was built in 1926 for Robert M. Carrier and his wife. In 1974, it was purchased by William S. Matthews, Jr. It was designed in the Jacobean Revival architectural style by Bryant Fleming, a Professor of Architecture at Cornell University. It has been listed on the National Register of Historic Places since May 27, 1980.

References

Houses on the National Register of Historic Places in Tennessee
Tudor Revival architecture in the United States
Houses completed in 1926
Houses in Memphis, Tennessee